Les McCann Ltd. Plays the Truth (also referred to as just The Truth) is the debut album by pianist Les McCann recorded in 1960 and released on the Pacific Jazz label. Liner notes were by Frank Evans and album photography was by Ivan Nagy.

Reception

Allmusic gives the album 4 stars.

Track listing 
All compositions by Les McCann except as indicated
 "Vacushna" - 3:09
 "A Little ¾ for God & Co." - 4:28
 "I'll Remember April" (Gene de Paul, Patricia Johnston, Don Raye) - 7:47
 "Fish This Week" - 3:06
 "How High the Moon" (Morgan Lewis, Nancy Hamilton) - 6:04
 "This Can't Be Love" (Richard Rodgers, Lorenz Hart) - 3:17
 "For Carl Perkins" (Leroy Vinnegar) - 5:40
 "The Truth" - 5:49

Personnel 
Les McCann - piano
Leroy Vinnegar - bass
Ron Jefferson - drums

References 

Les McCann albums
1960 albums
Pacific Jazz Records albums